The Switzerland women's national football team has played in just one FIFA Women's World Cup, in 2015.

FIFA Women's World Cup history

Record by opponent

2015 in Canada 

Group stage

Round of sixteen

2023 in Australia and New Zealand

Group stage

Goalscorers 

Switzerland has scored 11 goals, two of it are own goals.

References 

 
Countries at the FIFA Women's World Cup